This is the list of state governments of India dismissed by the Indian National Congress between 1952 and 2014.

List

References

Political crises in India